Christopher Rowe (born December 25, 1969) is an American science fiction and fantasy writer, whose stories have been finalists for the Hugo Award, the Nebula Award, the Theodore Sturgeon Memorial Award, and the World Fantasy Award.

Career
Rowe's first professionally published short story was "Kin to Crows" (Realms of Fantasy, 1998). His best-known story is "The Voluntary State" (Sci Fiction, 2004), which was nominated for multiple major awards. That story was followed by two sequels: "The Border State" (2017) and These Prisoning Hills (2022).

His 2017 short-story collection Telling the Map received positive reviews from Publishers Weekly ("wild creativity, haunting imagery, and lyricism"), Kirkus Reviews (a "clutch of complex, persuasive visions of an alternate South"), and Tor.com ("a stellar set of stories that mesh well together").

Personal life
He lives in Lexington, Kentucky with his wife, fellow author Gwenda Bond. The two met at a writing conference in 2001 and were married in 2004. They are co-authors for the The Supernormal Sleuthing Service book series.

Bibliography

Short fiction 
Collections
 
Stories

———————
Notes

References

External links

1969 births
Living people
American fantasy writers
American male novelists
American male short story writers
American science fiction writers
American short story writers
Asimov's Science Fiction people
People from Adair County, Kentucky
People from Lexington, Kentucky
Writers from Kentucky